This is a list of members of the Western Australian Legislative Assembly between the 1930 election and the 1933 election, together known as the 14th Parliament. It took place under radically altered boundaries as enacted within the Redistribution of Seats Act 1929, whose effect had been exaggerated by the lack of a redistribution for the previous 18 years. The gold mining areas, populous at the time of the 1911 redistribution, had been reduced to pocket boroughs by the decline in gold mining as an economic activity in the State; meanwhile, the agricultural and metropolitan areas had grown substantially. Ironically, the changes were enacted by a Labor government even though most of the safe seats being abolished were Labor seats—and for the fourth time in a row (Constitution Act Amendment Act 1899, and Redistribution of Seats Acts of 1904, 1911 and 1929), the government enacting the redistribution lost the subsequent election.

Notes
 Following the 1930 state election a new Ministry consisting of seven members, including one Member of the Legislative Council, was appointed on 24 April 1930. These members were therefore required to resign and contest ministerial by-elections on 1 May 1930, at which all were returned unopposed.
 On 14 December 1931, the Nationalist member for Roebourne, Frederick Teesdale, died. Nationalist candidate John Church won the resulting by-election held on 6 February 1932.
 On 10 May 1932, the Labor member for Kanowna, Thomas Walker. Labor candidate Emil Nulsen won the resulting by-election held on 25 June 1932.
 On 22 June 1932, the Labor member for Brownhill-Ivanhoe, John Lutey, died. Labor candidate Frederick Smith was elected unopposed on 14 July 1932.
 On 18 February 1933, Nationalist member and Minister Thomas Davy died suddenly while playing bridge with his wife and two friends at the Savoy Hotel. A by-election was not held due to the proximity of the 1933 state election.

Sources
 
 

Members of Western Australian parliaments by term